Bulgan is a town, administrative centre of Bulgan province of Mongolia. Bulgan sum has a population of 11,984 (2005, town proper 10,878), 12,323 (2008), town proper has a population of 11,198 (2008).

History 
Bulgan was founded in 1938.

Sights 
A former military point in the south of Bulgan, which was founded in 1921, was transformed into a museum. One of its buildings, which was used as a shop before 1921, dates from 1668.

There is another sightworthy museum in the center of town. Its most interesting part is a display on Mongolia's first man in space, J. Gurragchaa, who was born in Bulgan Aimag in 1947.

The mausoleum of Khatanbaatar Magsarjav, a national hero who liberated the Mongolian town of Khovd from the Chinese in 1912, can be seen on a hill in the southwest of Bulgan.
 
Dashchoinkhorlon Khiid is a monastery rebuilt in 1992. The former monastery, Bangiin Khuree which had been inhabited by about 1000 monks, was destroyed by order of Khorloogiin Choibalsan in 1937.

Nature Reserve 
Uran Togoo Tulga Nature Reserve (1600 hectare), about 60 km west of Bulgan, is famous for its extinct volcanoes, e.g. Uran Uul.

Transportation 
The Bulgan Airport (UGA/ZMBN) has one unpaved runway and is served by regular flights to Ulaanbaatar, Khovd, and Mörön.

Bulgan is linked to Erdenet and to Ulaanbaatar by a paved road.

Climate
Bulgan experiences a subarctic climate (Köppen climate classification Dwc) with mild summers and severely cold winters. Precipitation is very low, but significantly higher in summer than at other times of the year. Winters are very dry, although some snowfall occurs around April and October.

References 

Districts of Bulgan Province
Aimag centers
1938 establishments in Mongolia